Luis Orlando Hormazábal Gavilán (born February 13, 1959 in Santiago, Chile) is a former Chilean footballer who played for Colo-Colo. He played as a defender.

Teams
  Colo-Colo 1977-1989

Titles
  Colo-Colo 1977, 1979, 1981, 1983, 1986 and 1989 (Chilean Primera División Championship), 1981, 1982, 1985, 1988 and 1989 (Copa Chile)

References

External links
 
 

1959 births
Living people
Chilean footballers
Chile international footballers
Colo-Colo footballers
Chilean Primera División players
1987 Copa América players
Association football defenders